Two vessels of the Royal Navy have borne the name HMS Hardi,  albeit briefly. Both were French privateers that the Royal Navy captured, with the name being the French word for "daring":

  was the French 18-gun privateer sloop Hardi that  captured on 1 April 1797. The Navy sold Hardi in 1800.
HMS Hardi was the French privateer Hardi that  captured in 1800. She was broken up in 1809.

See also
 

Royal Navy ship names